Matt Shipman (born August 19, 1992) is an American voice actor. He started voice acting professionally in 2015 and was cast in his first lead role with Gear in World War Blue in 2016. Since 2016, some of his larger roles include Kazuya Kujo in Gosick, Hiro in Darling in the Franxx, Chrome in Dr. Stone, and Reki Kyan in SK8 the Infinity.

Biography
Matt Shipman was born on August 19. He started voice acting professionally in 2015 with additional voices for Holy Knight. One year later, he was cast in his first lead role, Gear from World War Blue. In 2018, Shipman married voice actress Brittany Lauda. In August 2021, Shipman and Jan Ochoa began co-hosting "Armed and Rangerous", a Mighty Morphin Power Rangers recap podcast produced for Giant Bomb.

Along with Lauda, Shipman co-owns audio production company Kocha Sound.

Filmography

Anime

Films

Video games

Awards

References

External links
 

21st-century American male actors
American male video game actors
American male voice actors
Living people
Year of birth missing (living people)